Senorise Perry (born September 19, 1991) is an American football running back who is currently a free agent. He played college football at Louisville. He was signed by the Chicago Bears as an undrafted free agent in 2014 and has also played for the Miami Dolphins, Buffalo Bills, and Tennessee Titans.

Early years
Perry attended and played high school football at Chattooga High School.

College career
Perry played college football at the University of Louisville from 2010 to 2013 under head coach Charlie Strong. In the 2011 season, he had 12 carries for 27 rushing yards and a rushing touchdown. In the 2012 season, he had 705 rushing yards and 11 rushing touchdowns. In the 2013 season, he had 677 rushing yards and six rushing touchdowns. During his career, he rushed for 1,409 yards on 289 carries with 18 touchdowns.

Professional career

Chicago Bears
On May 19, 2014, Perry was signed by the Chicago Bears after going undrafted in the 2014 NFL Draft. In the 2014 season, Perry appeared on special teams in all 16 games, as well as having a team-high 17 special teams tackles and 2 forced fumbles on special teams.

On September 1, 2015, Perry was placed on injured reserve with a foot injury.

On August 28, 2016, Perry was waived by the Bears. He was later signed to the Bears' practice squad. On September 13, he was released from their practice squad.

Miami Dolphins
On October 13, 2016, Perry was signed to the Dolphins' practice squad. He signed a reserve/future contract with the Dolphins on January 10, 2017. In the 2017 season, he appeared in all 16 games and had eight carries for 30 rushing yards and a three-yard reception.

Buffalo Bills
On March 28, 2019, Perry signed with the Buffalo Bills. Perry is notable for being the first person to wear the jersey number 32 for the Bills since O. J. Simpson wore the number from 1969 to 1977 (the number had been unofficially retired from circulation since Simpson's retirement). He was placed on injured reserve with a quadriceps injury on August 31, 2019, and released from IR with an injury settlement on September 4. He was re-signed on October 8.

Tennessee Titans
On April 30, 2020, Perry was signed by the Tennessee Titans to a one-year contract. He was released on September 5, 2020, but was re-signed a day later. He was placed on injured reserve on September 23, 2020. He was activated on November 18. He finished the 2020 regular season with two rushes for nine yards and no touchdowns.

References

External links
Tennessee Titans bio
Chicago Bears bio
Louisville Cardinals bio

1991 births
Living people
People from Summerville, Georgia
Players of American football from Georgia (U.S. state)
American football running backs
Louisville Cardinals football players
Chicago Bears players
Miami Dolphins players
Buffalo Bills players
Tennessee Titans players